Mary Edgar may refer to:

Mary Susanne Edgar (1889–1973), Canadian writer
Mary Edgar Mussi (1907–1991), British writer, who wrote as Mary Howard and Josephine Edgar